Paradox were a Christian black metal band founded in London, England, in 1996 by guitarist and vocalist Michael, using the pseudonym "John Tarantula". They were reported to be, at the time, the only dark metal band in London promoting Christianity. Originally formed as a three-piece family unit, they released a demo The Outcasts in 1997 through their own record label, Tarantula Promotions. In 1998, a fourth member joined as a vocalist, and a second demo was released in 2000 entitled Through Pain There Is Joy. Following this release, the band reformed around Michael as a five-piece unit, and a sixth member later joined part-time on keyboards. In 2002, Paradox disbanded, releasing their last two songs as part of a compilation album entitled Overcome or Burn Forever in Hell/Arachnid Terror Sampler, which featured tracks from fourteen other artists. Following the breakup of the band, the projects Bloodshed and Slimegem were formed, and a third band, Hamal 'ak Hamashith, was promoted through Tarantula Promotions.

History 
Michael has stated that before becoming a Christian, he played in band with his friends performing covers of bands such as Burzum, Darkthrone, Acheron, Beherit, and Havohej. In 1995, Michael converted to Christianity at a summer camp. His original band drifted apart, and in 1996 he formed a new band, Paradox, with his father and brother. The name "Paradox" was chosen because of the paradox of a Christian band playing very dark music. That year, the band released a demo entitled The Outcasts. UK-based Cross Rhythms Magazine later reviewed the demo and rated it six out of ten squares. Grey "The Invocator" later joined in 1998 as vocalist. According to Michael, Grey was not a Christian, but was a friend of his before his conversion and was comfortable with the goals of the band. A second demo, Through Pain There Is Joy, followed in 2000, which Cross Rhythms rated seven out of ten squares, and stated that the band was the "London's only dark metal band who are out there doing it for Christ." After this demo, the band line-up underwent a transition, with Michael "John Tarantula" re-forming Paradox with members Jasen "White Stick" on drums, Jeff "Death Warrior" on bass, Sam "Yellow Terror" on guitar, and Grey on vocals. In 2000, a new member, Rose "Dark Faery", joined part-time as a keyboardist. The band started recording at a professional studio, but then announced in 2002 that they would dissolve with the release of their final two songs on Overcome or Burn Forever in Hell/Arachnid Terror Sampler. This was a split release combining an EP, Overcome or Burn Forever in Hell, by Paradox, and a sampler album, Arachnid Terror Sampler, featuring fourteen other artists including Frosthardr, Frost Like Ashes, Kekal, Pantokrator, Sanctifica, Soul Embraced, and Tortured Conscience. Following the breakup of the band, Michael announced the formation of the projects Bloodshed and Slimegem.

Style and influences 
The band self-described their style as "Holy Black Sludge", a mixture of death, black, and doom metal. Critics have described the band as black metal, dark metal, and death metal. Michael has cited his influences as mostly material that he listened to before converting Christianity, listing Cathedral's Forest of Equilibrium, Mental Funeral by Autopsy, Unholy's The Second Ring of Power, Beherit's Drawing Down the Moon, Into Darkness by Winter, "most of" My Dying Bride, Havohej, Abruptum, and the vocals of Burzum.

Tarantula Promotions 
All the material by Paradox was self-released through Tarantula Promotions, that is managed by Michael. Following the breakup of the band, Tarantula Promotions featured two new bands, Bloodshed and Slimegem, and a friend of Michael started the band Hamal 'ak Hamashith, "which is ancient Hebrew for 'destroying angel'", under the label. The label also signed a distribution deal with Nordic Mission for the UK. Michael also published a newsletter, Fangs of Life, through Tarantula. He stated that one of the goals of this newsletter was to spread information about bands with positive lyrics, and was one of the main reasons for the release of the Arachnid Terror Sampler.

Discography 
The Outcasts (1997)
Through Pain There Is Joy (2000)
Overcome or Burn Forever in Hell/Arachnid Terror Sampler (2002)

Lineup 

Final Line-Up
Michael "John Tarantula" (1996–2002) – guitar, vocals
Grey "The Invocator" (1998–2002) – vocals
Jasen "White Stick" (2000–2002) – drums
Jeff "Death Warrior" (2000–2002) – bass guitar
Sam "Yellow Terror" (2000–2002) – lead guitar
Rose "Dark Faery" (2000–2002) – keyboards

Former
Michael's brother (1996–2000) – drums
Michael's father (1996–2000) – bass

References

External links 
Official website
Fangs of Life

Musical groups established in 1996
Musical groups disestablished in 2002
Musical groups from London
English death metal musical groups
English black metal musical groups
Christian extreme metal groups